Yichus ( yḥws), a Hebrew-based Yiddish word meaning "lineage". In some past and present Jewish communities, good  - meaning descent from a family of high reputation - is necessary for a person to be considered as a potential marriage partner.

Colloquially, the term refers to the chain of origin for a statement, creative work or object.

Etymology
 first appeared in the Bible in the Book of Ezra. In the later rabbinic Hebrew, the last letter of the root changed from sin to samekh, though the pronunciation and meaning remained unchanged. The latter spelling (yud-hey-samech) appears frequently in rabbinic literature.

Although the word  originated in Hebrew, the term is generally accepted as a Yiddish word that has flowed into Modern English.

History
As far back as the Talmudic era, being son-in-law to someone widely respected was valued.

From the 14th century onwards,  was an important concern for Eastern European Jews. Good  could refer to Torah scholarship or wealth, while bad  resulted from the suspicion of illegitimate descent. "In Lithuania some Jewish families hid their  (lineage)". Judgments of  became one of the mechanisms which determined social hierarchies.

From the 19th century, the significance of  declined as more marriages were based on romantic love, and reformers criticized  for leading to inbreeding within small circles of "acceptable" families. However, nowadays  is still an important qualification for marriage in charedi communities.

Yichus book
The family trees, or pedigree charts, of Jewish families, listing genealogy and family history records, have been identified with several names, among which are Yichus book, Yichus brief, and Yichus record.

To help a child trace lineage, some families would write a "Yichus book".

The focus of a Yichus brief (letter of relationship) is not as extensive as a Yichus Book whereas a Yichus book or Yichus record/"sefer yuchsin"/registry is community-oriented.

Some families also kept a separate "Register of Circumcisions".

Types of yichus

Mechutan
Although primarily used for same generation relatives, it can be used beyond that generation.

Ben achar ben

Family names
For various reasons, surnames/family names were changed, and sometimes reverted. Thus, Jewish family names have not always been a reliable indicator of ancestry. For example: certain family names, such as Cohen, are not as strongly indicative of being a Kohen as Katz.

References

External links
 Dem Ganefs Yiches (The Thief's Lineage), a 19th century song parodying the concept of yichus

Orthodox Judaism
Hebrew words and phrases
Yiddish words and phrases
Jewish marital law
Jewish life cycle
Genealogy
Family trees